Gilles Pennelle, born on 20 July 1962 in Dieppe, is a politician and teacher.

Biography 
Born on 20 July 1962 in Dieppe, Gilles Pennelle is a professor of history and geography.

He joined the FN in 1987. He was a municipal councillor from 1989 to 2001, then a regional councillor from 1992 to 2004.

In 2018, at the XVIth Congress of the National Front, he was elected to the National Council of the Party in 16th position.

Regional pooling in France (Bretagne area) June 2021: Jewish activists at the RN alert against candidates with a "sulfurous" past such as Gilles Pennelle source https://www.sudouest.fr/elections/regionales/regionales-des-militants-juifs-au-rn-alertent-contre-des-candidats-au-passe-sulfureux-3501878.amp.html
--Faure Nicolas Emile (talk) 20:27, 31 May 2021 (UTC)

References

External link 
 

Living people
1962 births